Deep-fried pizza is a dish consisting of a pizza that instead of being baked in an oven is deep-fried, resulting in a different flavour and nutritional profile. This technique is known in both Scotland and Italy, but there are numerous differences between the Scottish and Italian variants, which likely developed independently.

Italy
The Italian dish of pizza fritta (plural pizze fritte) originated in Napoli, and is usually made by frying a disk of pizza dough before applying toppings and serving. Alternatively, the fillings may be enclosed in a pocket of dough like a calzone, which is then fried. Frying allows one to prepare a pizza without a pizza oven, for example from a street food cart where an oven is impractical.

Scotland
Deep-fried pizza is available in many chip shops in Scotland. The basis is an inexpensive fresh or frozen oven-ready pizza consisting of a thick parbaked base with toppings already applied. This is then fried until crisp. The dish can be served as a "pizza supper" (with chips) or single (without chips), in whole and half pizza portions. The dish may be served with salt and vinegar, or with "salt and sauce" (a mixture of brown sauce and vinegar) in Edinburgh and the surrounding area per local chip shop custom. Often the chips will be poured onto one side of the pizza, and the pizza then closed around them.

This pizza is deep fried without batter, although another variation known as a "Pizza Crunch" consists of a large, battered pizza/half-pizza deep-fried, usually served with a hearty amount of chips and vinegar (which is then called a "Pizza Crunch Supper").

See also
 Deep-fried Mars bar
 Frybread
 Lángos
 List of deep fried foods
 Pizza puff

References

 For Scotland, deep fried pizza is the taste of home (The Daily Telegraph)

External links
 

Pizza
Scottish cuisine
Italian cuisine
Pizza styles